The Shalom Show on TV is a public affairs television program that focuses on Israel and Jewish life subject matter with cultural, educational, and entertainment programming of interest to the American Jewish community. The show features magazine-style specials and in-depth interviews with Israeli and American leaders in politics, business, technology, medicine, education, culture, and entertainment.

The Shalom Show airs throughout the United States on the Jewish Life Television network. The Shalom Show first aired in South Florida in 1979 on local broadcast stations.

Guests on The Shalom Show include Senior Pastor Bob Coy of the Calvary Chapel, Dr. Abraham S. Fischler, Congressman Allen West, and Stan Chesley. It has filmed segments and interviews in Israel.

The show was created and is hosted by Richard Peritz.

References

External links
 
 JLTV official site

Television series about Jews and Judaism
Jewish mass media in the United States
Jews and Judaism in Florida
1970s American television series
1980s American television series
1990s American television series
2000s American television series
2010s American television series
2020s American television series
1979 American television series debuts
First-run syndicated television programs in the United States